33rd New York Film Critics Circle Awards
January 28, 1968(announced December 28, 1967)

Best Picture: 
 In the Heat of the Night 
The 33rd New York Film Critics Circle Awards, honored the best filmmaking of 1967.

Winners
Best Actor:
Rod Steiger - In the Heat of the Night
Best Actress:
Edith Evans - The Whisperers
Best Director:
Mike Nichols - The Graduate
Best Film:
In the Heat of the Night
Best Foreign Language Film:
The War Is Over (La guerre est finie) • France/Sweden
Best Screenplay:
David Newman and Robert Benton - Bonnie and Clyde
Special Award:
Bosley Crowther

References

External links
1967 Awards

1967
New York Film Critics Circle Awards, 1967
New York Film Critics Circle Awards
New York Film Critics Circle Awards
New York Film Critics Circle Awards
New York Film Critics Circle Awards